Neither Rich nor Poor (Spanish: Ni pobres ni ricos) is a 1953 Mexican comedy drama film directed by Fernando Cortés.

Cast
 Lily Aclemar 
 Pepe Biondi 
 Guillermo Bravo Sosa 
 Dick  
 Fernando Galiana
 Ángel Garasa 
 Conchita Gentil Arcos
 Agustín Isunza 
 José Jasso 
 José Alfredo Jiménez 
 Víctor Junco 
 Ismael Larumbe 
 Carlos Martínez Baena 
 Gloria Marín 
 Pepe Nava 
 Manuel Noriega 
 José Pidal 
 Francisco Reiguera 
 Abel Salazar 
 Manuel Santigosa
 Jorge Treviño 
 Alfredo Varela padre 
 Pedro Vargas 
 Armando Velasco 
 Acela Vidaurri

References

Bibliography 
 María Luisa Amador. Cartelera cinematográfica, 1950-1959. UNAM, 1985.

External links 
 

1953 films
1953 comedy-drama films
Mexican comedy-drama films
1950s Spanish-language films
Films directed by Fernando Cortés
Mexican black-and-white films
1950s Mexican films